In the geometry of hyperbolic 3-space, the octahedron-hexagonal tiling honeycomb is a paracompact uniform honeycomb, constructed from octahedron, hexagonal tiling, and trihexagonal tiling cells, in a rhombicuboctahedron vertex figure. It has a single-ring Coxeter diagram, and is named by its two regular cells.

Symmetry
A lower symmetry form, index 6, of this honeycomb can be constructed with [(6,3,4,3*)] symmetry, represented by a trigonal trapezohedron fundamental domain, and a Coxeter diagram .

Related honeycombs

Cyclotruncated octahedral-hexagonal tiling  honeycomb 

The cyclotruncated octahedral-hexagonal tiling honeycomb is a compact uniform honeycomb, constructed from hexagonal tiling, cube, and truncated octahedron cells, in a triangular antiprism vertex figure. It has a Coxeter diagram .

Symmetry
A radial subgroup symmetry, index 6, of this honeycomb can be constructed with [(4,3,6,3*)], represented by a trigonal trapezohedron fundamental domain, and Coxeter diagram .

See also 
 Convex uniform honeycombs in hyperbolic space
 List of regular polytopes

References 
Coxeter, Regular Polytopes, 3rd. ed., Dover Publications, 1973. . (Tables I and II: Regular polytopes and honeycombs, pp. 294–296)
Coxeter, The Beauty of Geometry: Twelve Essays, Dover Publications, 1999  (Chapter 10: Regular honeycombs in hyperbolic space, Summary tables II,III,IV,V, p212-213)
 Jeffrey R. Weeks The Shape of Space, 2nd edition  (Chapter 16-17: Geometries on Three-manifolds I,II)
 Norman Johnson Uniform Polytopes, Manuscript
 N.W. Johnson: The Theory of Uniform Polytopes and Honeycombs, Ph.D. Dissertation, University of Toronto, 1966 
 N.W. Johnson: Geometries and Transformations, (2018) Chapter 13: Hyperbolic Coxeter groups

Hexagonal tilings
Honeycombs (geometry)